Charles Cecil Finucane (September 6, 1905 – November 7, 1983) was an American government official, and banking and investments executive.

Early life
Finucane was born in Spokane, Washington and attended the Taft School in Watertown, Connecticut.  He received an engineering degree in 1928 from Sheffield School, Yale University.

Career
He served as vice-president and then president of Sweeny Investment Company while also serving as an officer in the U.S. Navy Reserve.  From 1936-1938 he was vice-president of the Sunshine Consolidated Mining Co., and majority floor leader of the Washington State Legislature in 1939. In 1946 he served as director for both the Spokane and Eastern Division of the Seattle First National Bank and the James Smyth Plumbing and Heating Company of Spokane.

Government career
He was appointed Assistant Secretary of the Army for Financial Management in 1954, the Under Secretary of the Army in 1955, and then the Assistant Secretary of Defense in 1958.

Personal life
Finucane owned a summer home in Hayden, ID.

Notes

References

 Papers of Charles C. Finucane, Dwight D. Eisenhower Presidential Library

1905 births
1983 deaths
Eisenhower administration personnel
Businesspeople from Spokane, Washington
United States Army civilians
Yale School of Engineering & Applied Science alumni
United States Under Secretaries of the Army
20th-century American businesspeople